Patriarch Joachim I may refer to:

 Patriarch Joachim I of Bulgaria (r. 1234–1246)
 Patriarch Joachim I of Constantinople (r. 1498–1502 and 1504)
 Patriarch Joachim of Alexandria (1486–1567)
 Patriarch Joachim of Moscow and All Russia (1620–1690)